
Gmina Błażowa is an urban-rural gmina (administrative district) in Rzeszów County, Subcarpathian Voivodeship, in south-eastern Poland.

Villages
Apart from the town of Błażowa, Gmina Błażowa contains the villages and settlements of Białka, Błażowa Dolna, Błażowa Górna, Futoma, Kąkolówka, Lecka, Mokłuczka, Nowy Borek, Piątkowa and Ujazdy.

Neighbouring gminas
Gmina Błażowa is bordered by the gminas of Domaradz, Dynów, Hyżne, Lubenia, Niebylec, Nozdrzec and Tyczyn.

References
Polish official population figures 2006

Blazowa
Rzeszów County